Olivia Lynn Reeves (born April 19, 2003) is an American weightlifter. She won the gold medal in the women's 71kg event at the 2021 Junior World Weightlifting Championships held in Tashkent, Uzbekistan. She also won two medals in Snatch and Clean & Jerk events at the World Weightlifting Championships (in 2021 and 2022).

She won the gold medal in the women's 76kg event at the 2021 Junior Pan American Games held in Cali and Valle, Colombia. She won the silver medal in the Snatch event in the women's 71kg event at the 2021 World Weightlifting Championships held in Tashkent, Uzbekistan.

She won the bronze medal in the women's 71kg Clean & Jerk event at the 2022 World Weightlifting Championships held in Bogotá, Colombia.

Achievements

References

External links 
 

Living people
2003 births
Place of birth missing (living people)
American female weightlifters
21st-century American women